Woodlawn, also known as the Pease Mansion as well as Governor Shiver's Mansion, is a pre-Civil War mansion located at 30.2871° -97.7581° in Austin, Texas. The Greek Revival style house was owned by two Texas governors. Some notable people that have visited the mansion include Sam Houston, General George Custer,  Elisabet Ney, Will Rogers, and Edith Head. Woodlawn was added to the National Register of Historic Places on August 25, 1970.

History
Then Texas State Comptroller James Shaw commissioned master builder Abner H. Cook (who also designed the Texas Governor's Mansion) to build a house for him and his fiancée. Shaw's fiancée later broke off the engagement, but Shaw soon found another woman that he married and they lived in the house, which was completed in 1853.

Tragedy struck when Shaw's child died at the age of two and his wife died a few months later. Shaw sold the estate to Texas governor Elisha M. Pease and his wife Lucadia Christiane Niles Pease in 1857 and Shaw moved to Galveston. The Peases named the estate Woodlawn. Pease developed most of the land surrounding Woodlawn into the present-day neighborhood of Enfield.

Four generations of the Pease family lived at Woodlawn until 1957 when Niles Graham sold the house and its three remaining acres to outgoing Texas governor Allan Shivers and his wife Marialice Shary Shivers. The Shivers moved into Woodlawn on January 15, 1957, almost 100 years to the day when the Peases first moved into Woodlawn.

On October 27, 1975, the Shivers donated Woodlawn to the University of Texas at Austin and University of Texas–Pan American with the stipulation that they could live there until their deaths (see Life estate). Allan Shivers died in 1985 and Marialice died on September 29, 1996. The University of Texas sold Woodlawn to the State of Texas in December, 1997 for $2.6 million. The proceeds endowed the Allan Shivers Chair in Law and Banking at the University of Texas School of Law and the Marialice Shivers Chair in Fine Arts at the University of Texas–Pan American.

The state bought Woodlawn as Texas Lieutenant Governor Bob Bullock dreamed of making it the new Texas Governor's Mansion. Bullock died in 1999 and his dream passed with him. Since it no longer had a purpose for the estate and it was expensive to maintain, the State of Texas put Woodlawn up for sale in 2002 by sealed bid. Actress Sandra Bullock reportedly toured the home as a possible buyer but did not bid on it. Only one bid was received and it was not credible.

The state then began to contact interested buyers. Austin investor and entrepreneur Jeff Sandefer signed a contract to purchase the estate in May 2002. The $3.1 million deal broke down in August 2002 as Sandefer was frustrated by the restrictions and restoration requirements from Austin's Historic Landmark Commission and what it might cost to implement. Finally, on November 15, 2002, the estate sold to Mr. Sandefer for $2,851,100 via the holding company Woodlawn-Pease, LLC.

Today, Woodlawn is the centerpiece of the Old West Austin Historic District which consists mostly of land formerly owned by the Pease family.

Notes
  This information was obtained by phone from the Texas General Land Office Archives and Records. Sep. 28, 2006.

  According to Travis County property tax database, WOODLAWN PEASE LLC is a Jeff Sandefer Company.  Thus, Jeff Sandefer successfully purchased Woodlawn.  See:
http://www.traviscad.org/travisdetail.php?theKey=112663

External links
Austin Chronicle - "A Little Fixer-Upper"
Austin Chronicle - "Will He, Would He, Woodlawn?"

References

Bertetti, Laura and Sniffen, John. "Shivers Recounts Woodlawn Anecdotes". Daily Texan, Oct. 28, 1975.
Jayson, Sharon. "Pease Mansion again up for sale". Austin American-Statesman, Aug. 20, 2002.

Houses in Austin, Texas
Greek Revival houses in Texas
National Register of Historic Places in Austin, Texas
Houses on the National Register of Historic Places in Texas
Recorded Texas Historic Landmarks
City of Austin Historic Landmarks
Governor of Texas